was a Japanese courtier, Confucian scholar and kanshi poet of the early Heian period.

Biography 
Otondo was born in 811.

He was a grandson of Emperor Heizei through his father, Prince Abo.

The waka poets Ariwara no Yukihira and Narihira were his brothers.

He died in 877.

Descendants 

Names 
His clan name was initially written as 大枝, but was changed to 大江 in 866.

He is occasionally called by the honorific name .

Poetry

Characteristic style

Reception

Scholarship

References

Bibliography

External links 
Ōe no Otondo on Kotobank.

811 births
877 deaths
9th century in Japan
9th-century Japanese poets
People of Heian-period Japan
Ōe clan
Japanese nobility
Japanese male poets